The name Yolanda has been used for two tropical cyclones worldwide: one in the Eastern Pacific Ocean and one in the Philippines by PAGASA in the Western Pacific Ocean.

In the Eastern Pacific:
 Tropical Storm Yolanda (1992) – remained in the open ocean.

In the Western Pacific:
 Typhoon Haiyan (2013) (T1330, 31W, Yolanda) –  Category 5 super typhoon, caused massive destruction in the Philippines and in Southern China.

The name Yolanda was retired by PAGASA after the 2013 typhoon season, and replaced with Yasmin.

Pacific hurricane set index articles
Pacific typhoon set index articles